The Mountain Loop Highway is a highway in the U.S. state of Washington. It traverses the western section of the  Cascade Range within Snohomish County. The name suggests it forms a full loop, but it only is a small portion of  a loop, which is completed using State Routes 92, 9, and 530. Part of the highway is also a designated and signed Forest Highway, and is known as Forest Route 20.

The highway connects the towns of Granite Falls and Darrington. The unpaved section is U.S. Forest Service Road #20 and passes several USFS campgrounds. Portions of the unpaved section are often closed for periods of several years due to flood damage.

Between Granite Falls and Barlow Pass, the highway passes Big Four Mountain and the trailhead leading to the Big Four Ice Caves at its base. At Barlow Pass, a gravel road maintained by Snohomish County (closed to motor vehicles) branches from the highway and leads to the former silver mining town of Monte Cristo. The portion from Granite Falls to Barlow Pass follows the Stillaguamish River. The portion from Barlow Pass to Darrington follows the Sauk River. The "inside" of the highway's namesake loop is a large area  containing significant Cascade peaks, including Three Fingers (6850 ft, 2088 m), Whitehorse Mountain (6850 ft, 2088 m), Mount Dickerman (5723 ft, 1744  m), and Mount Forgotten (6005 ft, 1830 m).

Route description

Paved segment 1

The Mountain Loop Highway starts at the eastern end of SR 92 in Downtown Granite Falls. Within Downtown Granite Falls, SR 92 is called E Stanley Street and the Mountain Loop Highway is known called N Alder Street. The highway goes north away from Granite Falls and turns east at the point where the road meets the South Fork of the Stillaguamish River. From there, the road roughly follows the river and intersects some Forest Routes such as FR 4201, FR 4018, FR 4020, FR 4037, FR 4052, and FR 4059 while traversing the communities of Robe, Verlot, and Silverton before the river ends. The loop continues and intersects a private road that connects the highway to the Old Monte Cristo Townsite, which is located 4 miles east of Barlow Pass.

Unpaved segment

At Barlow Pass, the Mountain Loop Highway goes north, and becomes unpaved Forest Route 20 or FR 20. Shortly after becoming unpaved, FR 20 starts to follow the Sauk River towards Darrington. FR 20 goes northward past Bedal, and it becomes paved again at the new Whitechuck bridge (approximately mile marker 44).

Paved segment 2

From Whitechuck, the Mountain Loop Highway continues north along the Sauk River. On the opposite side of the river, the N. Sauk River Road (Forest Route 22) parallels the route of the Mountain Loop Highway. The loop enters Darrington, where Railroad Avenue splits from the highway to become a short bypass to the eastern end of the highway. The highway ends at SR 530.

History

The Mountain Loop Highway was established on March 23, 1936. Before the highway was built, primitive and very rough wagon roads connected the Monte Cristo Townsite with the small towns of Darrington and Granite Falls. A narrow wagon road, known as Wilmans Trail or Pioneer Trail, or simply the Sauk wagon road, was built from Sauk City on the Skagit River to Monte Cristo in 1891. That same year, the surveyor M.Q. Barlow discovered the feasibility of access to Monte Cristo via the South Fork Stillaguamish River. Mining interests funded a wagon road from Silverton to the Sauk wagon road via Barlow Pass. These roads roughly followed the current route of the Mountain Loop Highway along with some railroads. Construction of the road started in 1936 and finished in 1941. The road was closed in 1942 due to the World War II.

The highway closes mostly in the winter due to floods and reopens in the spring of the following year, but a windstorm in 2003 closed the highway. With other windstorms following in 2006 and 2007, the highway had to be closed until 2008.

The Mountain Loop Highway officially reopened on June 25, 2008, and the cities along the full loop (Arlington, Granite Falls, and Darrington) had a large celebration.

Major intersections

Related routes

Washington State Route 92
Washington State Route 530

References

External links

Mountain Loop Experience

Roads in Washington (state)
Mountain Loop
Mountain Loop
Transportation in Snohomish County, Washington
Tourist attractions in Snohomish County, Washington
Arlington, Washington